WEUZ (92.1 FM) is an urban contemporary format radio station that serves north Alabama and south-central Tennessee, United States. Its programming is a simulcast of co-owned WEUP-FM.  This programming is also simulcast on several broadcast translators.  The station's studios are located along Jordan Lane (U.S. Highway 231) in Northwest Huntsville, and its transmitter is located west of Goodspring, Tennessee.

This station was assigned the WEUZ call letters by the Federal Communications Commission on April 6, 2000.

Ownership
In 1987, a married couple, Hundley Batts, Sr. and Dr. Virginia Caples, acquired WXKI (92.1 FM, now WEUZ-FM), licensed to Minor Hill, Tennessee, (just north of the Alabama border). This followed their assumption of the ownership and operation of WEUP (AM).  They combined these operations and brought WEUP onto the FM broadcast airwaves.

They operated WEUP & WEUZ-FM under the parent company name of Broadcast One.  They continued to expand the station's audience by acquiring WHIY (1190 AM, now WEUV) and WXKI (103.1 FM, now WEUP-FM), both licensed to Moulton, Alabama, in 1989.  The stations were sold to Hundley Batts and Virginia Caples as part of a two-station deal by Moulton Broadcasting Co. Inc. (WHIY) and Lawco FM Ltd. (WXKI). WEUV (1700 AM, now WEUP (AM)) was later added to the group of stations that are part of the WEUP broadcast family.

Translators

References

External links
 WEUP-FM/WEUZ official website
 

Giles County, Tennessee
EUZ
Radio stations established in 1987
1987 establishments in Alabama
Urban contemporary radio stations in the United States